is a 1996 Japanese film directed by Kōhei Oguri. The film stars Ahn Sung-ki, Christine Hakim,  and Kōji Yakusho. The music is by Toshio Hosokawa. It is produced by Hiroshi Fujikura and Kiyoshi Kenmochi.

Cast
 Ahn Sung-ki as the sleeping man 
 Christine Hakim as Tia
 Kōji Yakusho as Kamimura
 Jun Hamamura as Old man at post office
 Tokie Hidari as Tomiko
 Masao Imafuku as Le père de Takuji
 Ittoku Kishibe as Chief
 Toshie Kobayashi as Middle-aged mother-in-law

References

External links
 

1990s Japanese-language films
1996 films
Films set in Gunma Prefecture
Films shot in Japan
Films directed by Kôhei Oguri
1990s Japanese films